Robert Edward Adamson, Jr. (December 28, 1920 – July 30, 2004) was a decorated commander in the United States Navy that served during World War II, the Korean War, and the Vietnam War, and reached the rank of vice admiral.

Early life
Adamson was born in Chicago, Illinois, son of Robert Edward Adamson Sr. and Helen Myra Adamson (née Flinn). He attended Newtown High School and Bayside High School before beginning his higher education at Columbia University. In 1940 Adamson received his appointment to the United States Naval Academy, Annapolis, Maryland. Adamson graduated with distinction with the Class of 1944, which graduated in June 1943, accelerated due to World War II. Adamson was immediately commissioned as an ensign in the United States Navy.

World War II
After being commissioned, ENS Adamson became a student at the Naval Air Station in Jacksonville, Florida. The USS San Diego joined the USS Saratoga in support of the invasion of Munda, New Georgia, and of Bougainville. Then supported the Bombing of Rabaul in November 1943. Ens Adamson aboard the USS Diego then took part in Battle of Tarawa 20–23 November 1943. She then escorted the USS Lexington back to Pearl Harbor for repairs. On 6 January 1944 the USS San Diego became part of Task Force 58 under command of Rear Admiral Marc Mitscher. Adamson then took part in Operations Flintlock and the Battle of Tarawa. The San Diego had some improvements made on her radar in San Francisco and headed back into the fight joining in on raids against Wake and Marcus Islands, the invasion of Saipan, the Battle of the Philippine Sea, the invasion of Guam and Tinian, and the first raids against the Philippines.

Post-war
From August to November 1945, Adamson reported to Gunnery Officers School in Washington DC. When LT Adamson was sent to the USS Massachusetts, she was in Puget Sound being overhauled. At the end of January she set sail for Hampton Roads, Virginia. In September 1946 LT Adamson joined the Staff of Commander Battleship-Cruiser Force, Atlantic Fleet as Aide and Flag Lieutenant.

In June 1947, Adamson returned to Annapolis to attend a course in ordnance engineering. The following June, Adamson began to receive instruction at the Massachusetts Institute of Technology in Cambridge, Massachusetts. In June 1950, Adamson received a Master of Science in Physics from MIT. After graduating, Adamson's next assignment was as an Operations Officer and Physicist with Joint Task Force Three (Preparation for Operation Greenhouse) under Task Group 31.1 at Los Alamos, New Mexico. Adamson was with Task Group 31.1 from July 1950 until July 1951, for his service there he was awarded the Air Fore Commendation Medal. In July 1951 Adamson reported to Los Alamos Scientific Laboratory as a physicist, and stayed there until December. While aboard the USS Brown, Adamson participated in operation in Korean waters during the Korean War.

Senior officer
In February 1954, LCDR Adamson became a staff officer with the Military Liaison Committee to the Atomic Energy Commission. While commanding the USS Naifeh, Adamson from January until June 1958 also was the commander of Reserve Escort Squadron TWELVE. In July 1958 until July 1959, Adamson reported to the Army Command and General Staff College at Fort Leavenworth, Kansas. After finishing his training, Adamson was assigned to the Livermore Branch, Field Command, Armed Forces Special Weapons Project, Livermore, California, and stayed there until July 1961. In October 1963 took command of the Destroyer Division ONE HUNDRED FIFTY-TWO.

In February 1967 he became the head of the General Purpose Objective Forces Section, Strategic Plans Division, Office of the Chief of Naval Operations, Navy Department and in September 1967 became Deputy Commander Naval Ship Systems Command for Maintenance and Logistic Support, Washington, DC. Adamson was awarded the Legion of Merit for his service as Deputy Commander Naval Ship Systems Command.

In December 1969 he took command of the US Naval Support Activity Danang, South Vietnam and later in July 1970 became Commander Naval Support Activity Saigon, South Vietnam. For his service as commander of US Naval Support Activity in Danang and Saigon, Adamson was awarded the Distinguished Service Medal.

In January 1971 Adamson was assigned brief duty in the Bureau of Naval Personnel, and in March 1971, assumed command of the South Atlantic Force, US Atlantic Fleet. For his service as command of the South Atlantic Force, RADM Adamson was awarded a Gold Star in lieu of the Second Legion of Merit. In June 1972 he became Deputy Chief of Naval Operations (Surface Warfare), Navy Department and in June 1974 was ordered detached for duty as Special Assistant to the Commander in Chief, US Atlantic Fleet. In January 1975, Adamson took command of the amphibious force, the cruiser-destroyer force, the service force and the mine warfare force were merged into the Naval Surface Force, U.S. Atlantic Fleet (SURFLANT). Adamson commanded SURFLANT upon its establishment until his retirement on July 1, 1977.

Later life
After retiring from the U.S. Navy, Vice Admiral Adamson retired with his wife to Williamsburg, Virginia. Adamson died in 2004 at the age of 83 and was interred in Arlington National Cemetery.

Awards

<div style="text-align: left;">

References

1920 births
2004 deaths
Military personnel from Chicago
Columbia University alumni
United States Naval Academy alumni
United States Navy personnel of World War II
United States Navy vice admirals
United States Navy personnel of the Korean War
United States Navy personnel of the Vietnam War